Federico Virga (born 28 October 1993) is an Italian football player who currently plays for A.S.D. Imperia.

Club career
He made his professional debut in the Segunda Liga for Olhanense on 7 August 2015 in a game against Benfica B.

In the summer 2019, Virga returned to A.S.D. Imperia.

References

External links
 
 

1993 births
Living people
Italian footballers
Italian expatriate footballers
S.C. Olhanense players
Serie D players
Liga Portugal 2 players
Association football midfielders
Italian expatriate sportspeople in Portugal
Expatriate footballers in Portugal